Raymonde is a given name. Notable people with the name include:

Raymonde Allain (1912–2008), French model and actress
Raymonde April, OC (born 1953), Canadian contemporary artist, photographer and academic
Raymonde Arsen née Vital, servant in the Comté de Foix in the early 14th century
Raymonde Berthoud (1919–2007), the fourth of Henri Berthoud and Marianne Perrier's five children
Raymonde Delaunois (1885–1984), Belgian mezzo-soprano opera singer
Raymonde Folco, Canadian politician, member of the Liberal Party of Canada
Raymonde Gagné CM OM (born 1957), Canadian politician and academic
Raymonde Guyot (born 1935), French film editor
Raymonde Veber Jones (1917–2016), French former tennis player
Raymonde Kacou (born 1987), Ivorian professional footballer
Raymonde de Kervern (1899–1973), Mauritian poet
Raymonde de Laroche (1882–1919), French pilot, the first woman to receive an aeroplane pilot's licence
Raymonde Naigre (born 1960), French athlete who specialises in the 200 meters and the 100 meter relay
Ivor Raymonde (1926–1990), British musician, songwriter, arranger and actor
Roy Raymonde (1929–2009), British editorial cartoonist e.g. in Playboy, Punch and The Sunday Telegraph
Simon Raymonde (born 1962), English musician and record producer
Tania Raymonde (born 1988), American actress
Raymonde Saint-Germain (born 1951), Canadian public servant and an independent member of the Senate of Canada
Raymonde of Sebonde (1385–1436), Catalan scholar, teacher of medicine and philosophy, regius professor of theology at Toulouse
Raymonde Testanière, known as Vuissane, was a servant in the Comté de Foix in the late 13th and early 14th centuries
Raymonde Le Texier (born 1939), member of the Senate of France, representing the Val-d'Oise department
Raymonde Tillon (1915–2016), French politician
Henri Marie Raymonde Toulouse-Lautrec (1864–1901), French painter, printmaker, draughtsman, caricaturist, and illustrator
Raymonde Vergauwen (1928–2018), Dutch breaststroke swimmer holding a Belgian passport
Raymonde Vincent (1908–1985), French woman of letters
Raymonde Vital, lived in the Comté de Foix in the fourteenth century, made notable when Emmanuel Le Roy Ladurie wrote about her in his 1975 book Montaillou

See also
Aymond
Ramond
Ramone (disambiguation)
Raymon
Raymond
Raymonden

French feminine given names